The Jilin Provincial Museum is a first-grade museum in Changchun, Jilin province, China, dedicated to history and art. It is a subordinate unit of the Jilin Province Department of Culture and Tourism.

History
The Jilin Provincial Museum was founded in 1951 and formally opened in Jilin City in 1952. In 1954, the provincial government seat was moved to Changchun, and the Jilin Provincial Museum followed it. In 2012, the museum was listed as a national first-grade museum. After nine years of construction, the museum moved to its present location on Yongshun Road, Nanguan District, in 2016.

Collection
Artefacts from the Goguryeo and Balhae kingdoms, as well as the Khitan Liao and Jurchen dynasties, make up a large proportion of the museum's collection. In addition, the museum has a large number of calligraphic art pieces from various historical periods, including the modern era, and cultural relics from the Northeast Anti-Japanese United Army.

Some of the museum's art pieces include:
Two scrolls painted by the Northern Song poet Su Shi
'Hundred Flower Painting' by the Southern Song painter Yang Jieyu
'Wenji returns to Han' by the Jurchen dynasty painter Jin Zhangyu
'Lin Li Gonglin's Nine Songs' by the Yuan dynasty painter Zhang Wo

Some of the museums artefacts include:
The 'Bing Wu Shen Gou', a silver belt hook with gold gilding from Buyeo
Bronze mirrors with Khitan script
A painted, stone-cut Khitan pagoda
Murals from the Khitan Kulun tombs

Exhibitions
There are a number of permanent, temporary, and digital exhibitions at the museum.

A collaborative exhibition between Jilin Provincial Museum and the Northeast Anti-Japanese United Army Memorial Hall called 'Souls of the Black Earth Army: Military History of the North-east Anti-Japanese United Army' was awarded a National Museums' 10 Great Exhibitions excellence award (2012–2013). The exhibition was designed to assist in developing a patriotic education.

Gallery
Artefacts

Art collection

References

External links

Museums established in 1951
Museums in Jilin
1951 establishments in China
Buildings and structures in Changchun
National first-grade museums of China
Art museums and galleries in China
Chinese art
Asian art museums in China